The Lupa Gold Field is an area of about  in south west Tanzania, north of Mbeya, that is known for its gold deposits. European mining is believed to have started after alluvial gold was found in water drawn from the Lupa River, near Lake Rukwa. Lode mining began in 1934 at Ntumbi and in 1939 at New Saza.

A number of new mines have opened in the field in recent years including New Luika Gold Mine, the principal mine of Shanta Gold.

References

Further reading
Lange, Siri. (2008) Land Tenure and Mining In Tanzania. Bergen: Chr. Michelson Institute.

Teale, E.O. (1928) Tanganyika Territory: Its Geology and Mineral Resources London: Mining Publications Ltd.

External links
Cotterell Collection: Life on the Lupa Goldfield, 1920s-1940s
MINING IN TANZANIA A brief on the Tanzanian Mineral Sector.

Mining in Tanzania